The 2020 Herr's Potato Chips 200 was the second stock car race of the 2020 ARCA Menards Series East season. The race was held on Saturday, June 13, 2020, in Toledo, Ohio, at Toledo Speedway, a 0.5-mile (0.80-km) permanent oval-shaped racetrack. The race was extended from its scheduled 200 laps to 204 due to a NASCAR overtime finish. At race's end, Ty Gibbs of Joe Gibbs Racing would maintain his dominance of the race on the final restart to win his second career ARCA Menards Series East win and his first of the season. To fill out the podium, Sam Mayer of GMS Racing and Bret Holmes of Bret Holmes Racing would finish second and third, respectively.

Background 
Toledo Speedway opened in 1960 and was paved in 1964. In 1978 it was sold to Thomas "Sonny" Adams Sr. The speedway was reacquired by ARCA in 1999. The track also features the weekly racing divisions of sportsman on the half-mile and Figure 8, factory stock, and four cylinders on a quarter-mile track inside the big track. They also have a series of races with outlaw-bodied late models that includes four 100-lap races and ends with Glass City 200. The track hosts the “Fastest short track show in the world” which features winged sprints and winged Super Modifieds on the half mile. Toledo also used to host a 200-lap late model race until its sale to ARCA in 1999.

Toledo is known for the foam blocks that line the race track, different than the concrete walls that line many short tracks throughout America. The crumbling walls can make track cleanup a tedious task for workers.

Entry list

Practice 
The only 45-minute practice session was held on Saturday, June 13.

Qualifying 
Qualifying was held on Saturday, June 13, at 4:45 PM EST. Each driver would have two laps to set a fastest time; the fastest of the two would count as their official qualifying lap.

Full qualifying results

Race results

References 

2020 ARCA Menards Series East
June 2020 sports events in the United States
2020 in sports in Ohio